Martin Heath (born 31 January 1973, in Stirling, United Kingdom) is a former professional squash player from Oban, Scotland.

Heath turned professional in 1994 after graduating from the University of Glasgow. He spent eleven years on the professional tour, including six consecutive years ranked in the world's top 10. His career-high ranking was World No. 4, which he reached in 1999. He won the Scottish national squash title six times. In 1996, Heath won the Singapore Open and repeated again in 1997, both times without losing a game.  However, it was not until 1998 that Heath made his debut in the top 10  at No. 7 by reaching the final of the Al Ahram International, beating World No. 1 Peter Nicol in the semi-finals. At the time, the Al Ahram event was the largest purse to date at $175,000. In 1999, Heath reached the semi-finals of the World Open, losing to eventual champion Peter Nicol 3 to 1. In 2000, he finished runner-up at the Tournament of Champions in New York City (beating Peter Nicol in the semi-finals, before losing to Jonathon Power in the final). His last competitive year was 2002 in which he reached the semi-finals of the Pakistan Open and quarter finals at the British Open and World Open.

Since retiring as a player in 2004, Heath has worked as a coach, performance director and sports journalist, writing a column for Squash Magazine and commentating on many PSA tour events as color and lead commentator, including the Commonwealth Games in 2014, BBC, TSN, ESPN & CBC. Heath was the Head Squash Coach for the University of Rochester men's varsity squash team, the "Yellowjackets". Heath led the team from a pre-season intercollegiate (CSA) ranking of No. 28 in 2005 to No. 1 in 2016. The Yellowjackets reached the semi-finals of the CSA National Championships in 2009, 2010 and 2011 and the final in 2016, losing narrowly to Yale after defeating Trinity College in the semi-finals.

As a consultant Heath took on Head Coach and Performance Director roles with the US National Teams, Scottish Teams, Canadian Teams and briefly with the Chinese National Teams, helping lead his teams to many international titles and medals, most notably the Men's World Doubles Championships in 2017. 

Heath currently plays a role as Head Squash Professional at the renowned Cambridge Club in Toronto, Canada, where he resides with his son, Kamren.

External links 
 
 
 
 
 Article at squashtalk.com (Feb 2001)

Scottish male squash players
1973 births
Living people